George Montague Wheeler (October 9, 1842 – May 3, 1905) was an American pioneering explorer and cartographer, leader of the Wheeler Survey, one of the major surveys of the western United States in the late nineteenth century. 

Wheeler was born in Hopkinton, Massachusetts, the son of John Wheeler and Miriam P. Daniels. He graduated from West Point in 1866, ranked sixth in his class, and was commissioned as a lieutenant in the US Army Corps of Engineers. He first served in California from 1866 to 1871. In 1869 General Edward O. C. Ord sent him on a reconnaissance through the eastern Nevada.

In 1872, the US Congress authorized an ambitious plan to map the portion of the United States west of the 100th meridian at a scale of 8 miles to the inch. This plan necessitated what became known as the Wheeler Survey, lasting until 1879, when the survey, along with the King and Powell Surveys, were terminated and their work was reorganized as the United States Geological Survey.

Wheeler was promoted to captain in 1879. In 1881 he represented the United States at the Third International Geographical Congress and Exhibition in Venice, Italy. He entered semi-retirement in 1883 but continued to write scientific reports until his full retirement from the army in 1888 at the rank of major. He died in New York City in 1905.

Wheeler Peak in Nevada (part of the Great Basin National Park), Wheeler Peak in New Mexico (the state high point), and the scenic Wheeler Geologic Area in southern Colorado are named for George Wheeler.

Publications
 
 Preliminary report concerning explorations and surveys, principally in Nevada and Arizona (1872)
 Address of Lieut. Geo. M. Wheeler...before the American Geographical Society (1874)
 Report upon the determination of the astronomical co-ordinates of the primary stations at Cheyenne, Wyoming Territory, and Colorado Springs, Colorado Territory (1874)
 Preliminary report upon a reconnaissance through southern and southeastern Nevada, made in 1869 (1875)

Notes

References

External links
A Guide to the Field notebooks of the Wheeler Survey, NC319. Special Collections, University Libraries, University of Nevada, Reno.
USGS history circular

Geographical Surveys West of the 100th Meridian Papers. Yale Collection of Western Americana, Beinecke Rare Book and Manuscript Library.

1842 births
1905 deaths
American cartographers
American explorers
United States Geological Survey personnel
Explorers of the United States